Strange Talk is an Australian synthpop duo from Melbourne, Victoria, consisting of Gerard Sidhu and Stephen Docker. Formed in 2010, their sound has been likened to that of Cut Copy, Passion Pit, Phoenix and Yeasayer. Strange Talk's most recent EP, E.V.O.L.U.T.I.O.N, was released on 16 October 2015 via Wind-up Records. On 17 September 2021, Strange Talk released Speech Therapy, the band's most recent album which was independently released.

History

Strange Talk launched into the public eye when they rose to the top as a featured artist during the 2010 Triple J Unearthed competition. In April 2011 they released their self-titled EP through Neon Gold Records and Fine Time Records which featured the singles "Climbing Walls" and "Eskimo Boy". The group reached number one on Billboards Uncharted chart for 17 September 2011 and the music video for "Climbing Walls" reached almost 400,000 YouTube views between August and September.

Strange Talk's debut studio album, Cast Away, was released on 8 February 2013 by Fine Time and Sony Music Australia. It charted at number fifty-six on the Australian Albums Chart.

The group has supported international acts The Rapture and Art vs. Science and performed alongside many others at Parklife, Good Vibrations, Playground Weekender, Future Music Festival, and Falls Festival.

The band signed with Wind-up Records for the rest of the world and released their debut album Cast Away in 2014.

In 2015 the group returned to the original duo format with principle members Gerard Sidhu and Stephen Docker remaining. On 16 October 2015 the group released their latest EP, E.V.O.L.U.T.I.O.N, via Wind-Up Records. The release is noted as a return to Strange Talk's electronic and dance oriented roots.

In 2021, Strange Talk released their first album in 9 years titled Speech Therapy. For the first time, the album was released independently.

Media
 Strange Talk's music has featured in television shows such as 90210, Offspring, Made in Chelsea''' and The Shire.
 The song "Eskimo Boy" was featured on the soundtrack for the video game Real Racing 3.
 The song "Cast Away" was featured on the soundtrack for the video game Need For Speed: Most Wanted.
 In April 2012 Strange Talk performed at the Emporio Armani store launch in Sydney.
 The song "Morning Sun" was featured on the soundtrack for the movie That Awkward Moment''.
 The song “Climbing Walls” was featured in the 2012 video game Sleeping Dogs.

Discography

Studio albums

EPs

Singles

Remixes

References

External links
 
 Strange Talk at Fine Time Records

Australian synthpop groups
Musical groups established in 2010
Musical groups from Melbourne
Musical quartets
2010 establishments in Australia